9ff is a German car tuning company based in Dortmund. It was founded by Jan Fatthauer in 2001. It specializes in converting stock Porsches into street legal racing vehicles, either as fully tuned cars, or by selling individual parts or kits. The former company, 9ff Fahrzeugtechnik GmbH, filed for bankruptcy in September 2013. A new company, 9ff Engineering GmbH was founded in October 2013.

History

Early years 
Jan Fatthauer founded 9ff Fahrzeugtechnik GmbH in 2001 in Dortmund, Germany, as a Porsche tuning company. Fatthauer earned a degree in automotive engineering, and had worked at recognized tuners until 2001. 

In May 2004, 9ff achieved its first record, reaching  with a 9ff T6 on the Nardo Ring race track in Nardo, Italy. The company claimed that they had the "fastest Porsche in Nardo". This car held the record for the world's fastest car until the company beat that record with the GT9 later that year. At the time, 9ff was building a wide variety of products, including some powered by alternative fuel, setting several records.

In September 2006, the 9ff TRC-85 reached , becoming the fastest street-legal convertible of its time.

On April 10, 2008, the 9ff GT9 reached   (confirmed with GPS), becoming the fastest street-legal car in the world.

In 2009, 9ff unveiled the Speed9, the second car entirely built by 9ff. The Speed9 is a classic roadster that has a lower windshield and cleaner horizontal lines than the 1955 Porsche 356/1 500S Speedster and the 911 and 964 Speedster (1989 and 1993 respectively) that it is based on.

In early 2010, 9ff introduced the twin-turbocharged version of the Porsche GT3 and the Porsche GT3RS, through its new tuning program, the GTurbo. Two  turbochargers were added to upgrade the vehicle's horsepower to 750, 850 or 1,000 hp. 9ff added new bumpers front and rear, side skirts, new quarter panels, and extra vents. The company also upgraded the direct-injection Porsche Turbo.

Bankruptcy 
In 2013 9ff filed for bankruptcy, along with Gumpert, Wiesmann, Artega and Lola. This has been attributed to a decline in business as Porsche drew in more customers seeking unmodified cars. A new company, 9ff Engineering GmbH, was founded in October of the same year.

Models 
Production (2019):
 9ff GTurbo
 9ff GTronic
 9ff GT9
 9ff Speed9

Discontinued models (partial list):

9ff T6
9ffV400
9ff TRC-85
9ff TRC-91

References

External links

Companies based in Dortmund
Automotive companies of Germany
Automotive companies established in 2001
Automotive motorsports and performance companies
German companies disestablished in 2013
German companies established in 2001
Porsche